is a Japanese manga artist and fashion writer, with numerous books published in both categories. Her work Sugar Sugar Rune won the Kodansha manga award for children in 2005. Anno is married to director Hideaki Anno of Neon Genesis Evangelion fame. Anno has aspired to being a manga artist since her third year at elementary school.

Works 
Anno draws inspiration from the fashion world, and her work is noted for its detail which gives it a broader appeal than just the demographic it is aimed for. She delves into the psychology of her characters. Her manga and books have attained considerable popularity among young women in Japan. Though she primarily writes manga of the josei demographic, her most popular series, Sugar Sugar Rune, (serialized in Nakayoshi) is targeted at primary school-aged girls. In a recent Oricon poll, she was voted the number eight most popular manga artist among females and thirteen in the general category. Her manga Happy Mania was made into a television series in 1998, followed by Hataraki Man in October 2007. Sakuran was made into a movie in 2006. More than 3 million copies were sold of Happy Mania.

In the movie Japan Sinks, she has a cameo role alongside her husband; their characters were also married. The movie was directed by Shinji Higuchi, who, like her husband Hideaki Anno, is a co-founder of Gainax.

Anno took a career hiatus in 2008, citing health reasons. During this hiatus, Anno published essays in manga form about her life with her husband.

In October 2020, it was announced Anno's manga Memoirs of Amorous Gentlemen will be adapted into a Broadway musical. It will be the first Japanese manga to be adapted into an American musical.

Awards and honors 
 Anno won the 29th Kodansha Manga Award for children's manga in 2005 for Sugar Sugar Rune.
 Asteroid 300082 Moyocoanno, discovered by Japanese amateur astronomer Yasuhide Fujita in 2006, was named in her honor. The official  was published by the Minor Planet Center on 6 April 2012.

List of works

References

External links 
 

 
Hideaki Anno
1971 births
Living people
Women manga artists
Japanese female comics artists
Manga artists from Tokyo
Female comics writers
20th-century Japanese women writers
20th-century Japanese writers
21st-century Japanese women writers
21st-century Japanese writers
People from Suginami